This is a complete list of four-star admirals in the United States Navy. The rank of admiral (or full admiral, or four-star admiral) is the highest rank normally achievable in the U.S. Navy. It ranks above vice admiral (three-star admiral) and below fleet admiral (five-star admiral).

There have been 275 four-star admirals in the history of the U.S. Navy. Of these, 234 achieved that rank while on active duty, 40 were promoted upon retirement in recognition of combat citations, and one was promoted posthumously. Admirals entered the Navy via several paths: 237 were commissioned via the U.S. Naval Academy (USNA), 22 via Naval Reserve Officers Training Corps (NROTC), 9 via Officer Candidate School (OCS), 2 via warrant, 2 via Aviation Officer Candidate School (AOCS), one via direct commission (direct), one via the Naval Aviation Cadet (NAVCAD) program, and one via the U.S. Merchant Marine.

List of admirals

Entries in the following list of four-star admirals are indexed by the numerical order in which each officer was promoted to that rank while on active duty, or by an asterisk (*) if the officer did not serve in that rank while on active duty. Each entry lists the admiral's name, date of rank, active-duty positions held while serving at four-star rank, number of years of active-duty service at four-star rank (Yrs), year commissioned and source of commission, number of years in commission when promoted to four-star rank (YC), and other biographical notes.

Tombstone admirals
The Act of Congress of 4 March 1925, allowed officers in the Navy, Marine Corps, and Coast Guard to be promoted one grade upon retirement if they had been specially commended for performance of duty in actual combat. Combat citation promotions were colloquially known as "tombstone promotions" because they conferred all the perks and prestige of the higher rank including the loftier title on their tombstones but no additional retirement pay. The Act of Congress of 23 February 1942, enabled tombstone promotions to three- and four-star grades. Tombstone promotions were subsequently restricted to citations issued before 1 January 1947, and finally eliminated altogether effective 1 November 1959.

Any admiral who actually served in a grade while on active duty receives precedence on the retired list over any tombstone admiral holding the same retired grade. Tombstone admirals rank among each other according to the dates of their highest active duty grade.

History

Four-star positions

1866–1941
The rank of admiral was created in 1866 to honor the Civil War achievements of David Farragut. Upon his death, another Civil War hero, David D. Porter Jr., succeeded to the title. In 1873, Congress stated that further vacancies in the grade would not be filled, and the rank lapsed with Porter's death in 1890. Congress revived the rank in 1899 to honor George Dewey, stipulating that the grade would again cease to exist upon his death or retirement. In 1903, Dewey was promoted to the unique rank of Admiral of the Navy, which during his lifetime was considered to be equivalent to an admiral of the fleet, but was later declared to be senior to the five-star grade of fleet admiral.

The Act of 3 March 1915, provided that the commanders in chief of the Atlantic, Pacific, and Asiatic Fleets would have the rank of admiral while so serving, and their seconds in command the rank of vice admiral. In 1916, the Chief of Naval Operations was also made an admiral while so serving, ranking next after the Admiral of the Navy. The ranks of admiral and vice admiral were strictly temporary appointments for the duration of an officer's tour in designated billets, and the temporary admiral reverted to his permanent grade of rear admiral immediately upon vacating the office bearing the title.

In 1917, Congress accommodated the Navy's desire to reorganize the fleet by authorizing the President to appoint three admirals and three vice admirals for any six fleet command positions. All fleet command tours lasted one year except for the commander in chief of the U.S. Fleet, whose term was sometimes renewed for a second year, and the commander in chief of the Asiatic Fleet, whose command was considered a backwater. (The Chief of Naval Operations was appointed for four years.) Officers would typically "fleet up" to admiral or vice admiral for their year of fleet command and then revert to rear admiral to mark time until mandatory retirement.

1941–1991

During World War II, the President was authorized to create as many admirals and vice admirals as he deemed necessary for the duration of the emergency. Most of these new creations retired at the end of the war, having been promoted to reward service in the fleet or headquarters, or to achieve parity with wartime counterparts. Although three- and four-star ranks remained temporary appointments, the practice of reverting to a lower grade pending retirement largely halted after 1942, when Congress authorized officers to be retired in the highest grade in which they served on active duty. The rank of fleet admiral was created in 1944, and the four officers promoted to that grade were allowed to remain on active duty permanently.

By 1956, the Navy had equilibrated at a total of seven permanent billets bearing four-star rank: the Chief of Naval Operations (CNO); the Vice Chief of Naval Operations (VCNO), the commanders in chief of the unified commands in the Pacific (CINCPAC) and Atlantic (CINCLANT); the commander in chief of the U.S. Pacific Fleet (CINCPACFLT); the commander in chief of U.S. Naval Forces, Eastern Atlantic and Mediterranean (CINCNELM) (retitled commander in chief of U.S. Naval Forces Europe (CINCUSNAVEUR) in 1960); and the commander in chief of North Atlantic Treaty Organization (NATO) forces in Southern Europe (CINCSOUTH). In 1965, an eighth billet was added when the chief of naval material (CNM) was promoted to admiral. Occasionally this count would fluctuate when a Navy officer was selected as the Chairman of the Joint Chiefs of Staff (CJCS), as the chairman's four-star representative to the NATO Military Committee (USMILREP), or as the director or deputy director of central intelligence; or by special legislation.

When the long-serving director of the naval nuclear reactor program, Hyman G. Rickover, was finally compelled to retire in 1982, his successor was promoted to admiral and appointed director of naval nuclear propulsion, institutionalizing the position as a permanent four-star billet. To compensate, another four-star billet was eliminated by merging Allied Forces Southern Europe with U.S. Naval Forces Europe. Similarly, when the U.S. Atlantic Fleet commander (CINCLANTFLT) was separated from the Atlantic unified commander in 1985, the number of four-star billets was conserved by eliminating the chief of naval material position. The U.S. Atlantic Fleet was replaced by U.S. Fleet Forces Command (COMUSFF) in 2006.

1991–present

With the end of the Cold War, U.S. Atlantic Command was repurposed as the joint force trainer, becoming U.S. Joint Forces Command in 1999. The change in mission cost the Navy its traditional monopoly over that command, which has since rotated among all the services, but the Navy made up the difference through repeated appointments to other combatant commands and to the vice chairmanship of the Joint Chiefs of Staff (VJCS). All military commanders in chief were retitled "Commanders" in 2002, when the title of "Commander in Chief" was reserved solely to the President of the United States.

See also
 Admiral (United States)
 List of active duty United States four-star officers
 List of United States Air Force four-star generals
 List of United States Army four-star generals
 List of United States Coast Guard four-star admirals
 List of United States Marine Corps four-star generals
 List of United States military leaders by rank
 List of United States Public Health Service Commissioned Corps four-star admirals
 List of United States Space Force four-star generals
 List of United States Navy vice admirals on active duty before 1960
 List of United States Navy vice admirals from 2000 to 2009
 List of United States Navy vice admirals from 2010 to 2019
 List of United States Navy vice admirals since 2020

References

Bibliography

 

United States Navy
United States Navy admirals
 
Admirals
United States Navy admirals